Thornton Junction railway station served the village of Thornton, Fife, Scotland from 1847 to 1969 on the Fife Coast Railway.

History 
The station opened on 17 September 1847 as Thornton by the Edinburgh and Northern Railway. It was situated north of the triangle junction. The name was changed to Thornton Junction by the LNER on 1 July 1923. The station closed to both passengers and goods traffic on 6 October 1969.

References 

Disused railway stations in Fife
Former North British Railway stations
Railway stations in Great Britain opened in 1847
Railway stations in Great Britain closed in 1969
1847 establishments in Scotland
1969 disestablishments in Scotland